Climate-smart agriculture (CSA) (or climate resilient agriculture) is an integrated approach to managing landscapes to help adapt agricultural methods, livestock and crops to the effects of climate change and, where possible, counteract it by reducing greenhouse gas emissions from agriculture, at the same time taking into account the growing world population to ensure food security. Thus, the emphasis is not simply on carbon farming or sustainable agriculture, but also on increasing agricultural productivity. "CSA ... is in line with FAO’s vision for Sustainable Food and Agriculture and supports FAO’s goal to make agriculture, forestry and fisheries more productive and more sustainable".

CSA has three pillars: increasing agricultural productivity and incomes; adapting and building resilience to climate change; and reducing or removing greenhouse gas emissions from agriculture. CSA lists different actions to counter the future challenges for crops and plants. With respect to rising temperatures and heat stress, e.g. CSA recommends the production of heat tolerant crop varieties, mulching, water management, shade house, boundary trees and appropriate housing and spacing for cattle. There are attempts to mainstream CSA into core government policies, expenditures and planning frameworks. In order for CSA policies to be effective, they must be able to contribute to broader economic growth, the sustainable development goals and poverty reduction. They must also be integrated with disaster risk management strategies, actions, and social safety net programmes.

Methods and assessment 
The Food and Agriculture Organization has identified several tools for countries and individuals to assess, monitor and evaluate integral parts of CSA planning and implementation by the FAO. Some of these tools include:

 Modelling System for Agricultural Impacts of Climate Change (MOSAICC): This modelling system helps countries conduct inter-disciplinary climate change impact assessment on agriculture through simulations.
 Global Livestock Environmental Assessment Model (GLEAM): This simulates the interaction of activities and processes involved in livestock production (milk and meat production) and the environment. The model is designed to evaluate several environmental impact categories, such as greenhouse gas emissions, nutrient and water use, land use and land degradation and biodiversity interactions.
 Sustainability Assessment of Food and Agriculture (SAFA) system: The guidelines of SAFA is a framework for sustainability performance assessment in the food and agriculture sector, including crop and livestock production, forestry and fisheries. The monitoring and evaluation of activities set baselines, define indicators, measure progress and evaluate successes and setbacks in CSA interventions.
 Economics and Policy Innovations for Climate-Smart Agriculture (EPIC): The programme works with governments, universities, research centres and other institutional partners in support of their transition to CSA through economic and policy analysis. It does this by identifying and harmonizing climate-smart agricultural policies, impacts analysis, effects, costs and benefits as well as incentives and barriers to the adoption of climate-smart agricultural practices.
 Ex-Ante Carbon-balance Tool (EX-ACT):  This appraisal system was developed by FAO. In the project development phase, it provides ex-ante estimates of the impact of agriculture and forestry development projects, programmes and policies on the carbon-balance.
 Climate Risk Management (CRM):  This integrated approach addresses vulnerabilities to short-term climate variability and longer-term climate change within the framework of sustainable development. The key component of the FAO's CRM involves the provision of weather and climate information products for farmers, fishers and livestock herders for the assessment of risks so as to improve opportunities at local level.
 Gender mainstreaming: In order to achieve CSA in a socially sustainable way; there is a need to understand the roles, capabilities and responsibilities of men and women to ensure equal access to CSA policies and practices benefits.
 Monitoring and Assessment of Greenhouse Gas Emissions and Mitigation Potential in Agriculture (MAGHG) project: This project falls under the MICCA (Mitigation of Climate Change in Agriculture) programme. Under this project, member countries are supported in gathering and reporting data on GHG emissions in the agriculture, forestry and other land use (AFOLU) sector for UNFCCC related reporting requirements.

Components 
CSA has three pillars: increasing agricultural productivity and incomes; adapting and building resilience to climate change; and reducing or removing greenhouse gas emissions from agriculture.

Carbon farming 
Carbon farming is one of the components of climate-smart agriculture and aims at reducing or removing greenhouse gas emissions from agriculture. .

Climate-smart agriculture and gender 
Men, women, boys, and girls are affected by climate change in different ways. To increase the effectiveness and sustainability of CSA interventions, they must be designed to address gender inequalities and discriminations against people at risk. Gender gap in agriculture implies that men and women farmers have varying access to resources to prepare for and respond to climate change. Women farmers are more prone to climate risk compared to men.  It has been reported that in developing countries, women have less access compared to men to productive resources, financial capital, and advisory services. They often tend to be excluded from decision making which may impact on their adoption of technologies and practices that could help them adapt to climatic conditions.  A gender-responsive approach to CSA tries to identify and address the diverse constraints faced by men and women and recognizes their specific capabilities. Climate Smart Agriculture presents opportunities for women in agriculture to engage in sustainable production. Climate change affects men and women differently. There is need to level the field and CSA is an opportunity for women in agriculture to engage more productively.

Challenges 
The greatest concern with CSA is that no universally acceptable standard exists against which those who call themselves "climate-smart" are actually acting climate smart. Until those certifications are created and met, skeptics are concerned that big businesses will just continue to use the name to ‘greenwash’ their organizations—or provide a false sense of environmental stewardship. CSA can be seen as a meaningless label that is applicable to virtually anything, and this is deliberate as it is meant to conceal the social, political and environmental implications of the different technology choices.

In 2014 The Guardian reported that climate-smart agriculture had been criticised as a form of greenwashing.

See also
Climate resilience
Effects of climate change on agriculture
Greenhouse gas emissions from agriculture
Agroindustry
Electric tractor

References

Food and Agriculture Organization
Food security
Climate action plans
Climate change and agriculture
Climate change adaptation